Sir William Robert Campion,  (3 July 1870 – 2 January 1951) was a British soldier, politician, and the 21st Governor of Western Australia from 1924 to 1931.

Early years
Born in London, England on 3 July 1870, Campion was educated at Eton College and the University of Oxford, and was the Conservative MP for Lewes from 1910 to 1924.

Military career
Campion was commissioned into the part-time 2nd Volunteer Battalion, Royal Sussex Regiment, later 4th Battalion, Royal Sussex Regiment (of which his father was Honorary Colonel) in 1888. On the outbreak of World War I he was the battalion's senior Captain with the rank of honorary Major. He became Lieutenant-Colonel of the 1st Line battalion (1/4th Royal Sussex) and commanded it in the Gallipoli campaign. At its first action, at Suvla Bay on 9 August 1915, the Official History records that the orders given to Lt-Col Campion 'were vague in the extreme. The colonel was verbally told "to restore the line". No one knew where it was, but he was told that "if he went in that direction (pointing to a column of smoke from the burning scrub) he ought to find the 2/4th Queen's".' The 1/4th Sussex advanced steadily in extended order, found the Queen's who had been driven off the crest, and consolidated a line, having suffered heavy casualties. Campion was evacuated to England sick on 5 October.

Campion later commanded 15th (Reserve) Bn Royal Fusiliers in the UK and then went to France to command 6th (Service) Bn Bedfordshire Regiment and 17th (Garrison) Bn Royal Sussex on the Western Front before returning to the 4th Royal Sussex after its arrival from the Mediterranean in 1918. He led the battalion through the final Allied Hundred Days Offensive. He was awarded the Distinguished Service Order in 1918 and continued to command the battalion in the postwar Territorial Army.

Governor of Western Australia

In June 1924 Campion was appointed Governor of Western Australia. From October 1924 to June 1931 Campion worked with Labor and Nationalist premiers alike in harmony during a period without major political crises. He presided with dignity over the state's centennial celebrations in 1929.

Later years
Campion returned to England in 1931 and retired to his country house in Sussex, but spoke frequently in favour of organized migration to Australia. He was a member of the Empire Settlement Committee in 1935. He accepted appointment as chairman of two Australian based gold-mining companies. He visited Australia in 1935–36 to inspect properties and again in 1939.
 
Campion died in Sussex on 2 January 1951, survived by his wife and four children: William Simon Campion (1895–1976) – married, with issue; Dorothy Mary Campion, Countess of Carnegie (1897–1967), married to John Carnegie, 12th Earl of Northesk with issue; Wilfred Edward Campion (1899–1972) – married with issue (divorced); Barbara Campion Willis Fleming (1903–1999)  – married with issue (divorced).

References

External links
 

1870 births
1951 deaths
Royal Sussex Regiment officers
Governors of Western Australia
Conservative Party (UK) MPs for English constituencies
Knights Commander of the Order of St Michael and St George
Companions of the Distinguished Service Order
Deputy Lieutenants of Sussex
UK MPs 1910
UK MPs 1910–1918
UK MPs 1918–1922
UK MPs 1922–1923
UK MPs 1923–1924
British Army personnel of World War I
Alumni of the University of Oxford
People from Hassocks